Steven Dennis Dewick (born 2 February 1976) is an Australian backstroke swimmer who won a bronze medal in the 4×100-metre medley relay at the 1996 Summer Olympics in Atlanta.

Dewick made his senior international debut when he was selected for Australia to compete at the Oceania Championships in 1993.  A star at the 1994 Commonwealth Games in Victoria, British Columbia, Canada, he collected a silver medal in the 100-metre backstroke, and a gold medal in the 4×100-metre medley relay.  Steven was voted as the performance of the games for his 100-metre backstroke.

In Atlanta, Dewick combined with Phil Rogers, Scott Miller and Michael Klim to trail the United States and Russia teams into third place.  Dewick also competed in the 100-metre backstroke, advancing to the semifinals. A great achievement considering Steven was swimming with a broken back from an accident at the Olympic village two days prior to the start of the 1996 games.

See also
 List of Commonwealth Games medallists in swimming (men)
 List of Olympic medalists in swimming (men)

References
 Profile

1976 births
Living people
Australian male backstroke swimmers
Olympic swimmers of Australia
Olympic bronze medalists for Australia
Swimmers at the 1996 Summer Olympics
Swimmers at the 1994 Commonwealth Games
Swimmers from Sydney
Olympic bronze medalists in swimming
Medalists at the 1996 Summer Olympics
Commonwealth Games gold medallists for Australia
Commonwealth Games silver medallists for Australia
Commonwealth Games medallists in swimming
20th-century Australian people
Medallists at the 1994 Commonwealth Games